Phagocyte bactericidal dysfunction refers to a class of medical conditions where phagocytes have a diminished ability to fight bacterial infection.

Examples include:
 Hyperimmunoglobulin E syndrome
 Chédiak–Higashi syndrome
 Chronic granulomatous disease

References

External links 

 

Congenital defects of phagocyte number, function, or both